Tropical Dandy is Haruomi Hosono's second solo album. This album continues the tropical style of Hosono House (which would continue later on with Bon Voyage co. and Paraiso) and also features performances from "Caramel Mama" (who had, by this point, changed their name to "Tin Pan Alley"). This album was re-issued as part of a box set with bonus tracks taken from Tin Pan Alley albums by Crown decades later.

Track listing

Album cover
The album's cover is a parody of the sailor-themed packaging of Player's Navy Cut cigarettes, similar to the 1969 Procol Harum album, A Salty Dog. The quotation marks around Hosono's surname is in reference to the "medium" version of the cigarette. The cover also portrays a ship resembling the RMS Titanic, which Hosono's grandfather Masabumi infamously escaped the sinking of on her maiden voyage.

Personnel
Haruomi Hosono - Bass, Vocals, Mellotron, Marimba, Guitar (Acoustic & Electric), Clavinet, Cowbell, Whistle, Backing Vocals/Choir, Production, Liner notes
Masataka Matsutoya - Piano, Hammond organ, String Arrangements
Shigeru Suzuki - Electric Guitar, Backing Vocals/Choir
Tatsuo Hayashi - Drums, Percussion
Hiroki Komazawa - Pedal steel guitar
Hiroshi Satō - Piano, Clavinet
Ginji Itō - Electric Guitar
Motoya Hamaguchi - Percussion
Makoto Yano - Strings, Horn (Wind and Brass) & String Arrangements
Minako Yoshida - Duet Vocals, Backing Vocals/Choir
Makoto Kubota - Backing Vocals/Choir, Scat Vocals
Teruyuki Fukushima - Trumpet
Masayuki Kuniyoshi - Flute
Yōji Yamashita - Ukulele
Clare Francis - Voice
Kayo Ito, Taeko Ōnuki & Kōsetsu Minami - Backing Vocals/Choir
Kazuhiro Ichihashi - Backing Vocals/Choir, Assistant Engineering
Shincihi Furuzaki - Re-mixing
Yasuo Yagi - Cover and Back Tropical Artwork, Concept Art
Michiko Oshima - Liner Artwork
Takumi Uchida - Photography

References 

1975 albums
Haruomi Hosono albums